Koskovo is a rural locality (a selo) in Kichmegnskoye Rural Settlement, Kichmengsko-Gorodetsky District, Vologda Oblast, Russia. The population was 270 as of 2002. There are 12 streets.

Geography 
Koskovo is located 18 km southeast of Kichmengsky Gorodok (the district's administrative centre) by road. Ploskaya is the nearest rural locality.

References 

Rural localities in Kichmengsko-Gorodetsky District